This is a list of films which placed number-one at the weekend box office in Belgium during 2017. Amounts are in American dollars.

Highest-grossing films

References

2017 in Belgium
2017
Belgium